Mildred Banfield (née Harshburger; January 17, 1914 – June 5, 1991) was a teacher, social worker and Republican politician in the U.S. state of Alaska.

Born in Fremont, Nebraska, Banfield attended Midland College and University of Chicago. She then worked as a teacher and a matron for children's homes before moving to Juneau, Alaska. She married Norman Banfield in 1951, who had been partners for several years with another young lawyer, Robert Boochever. She was appointed to a vacancy in the Alaska Senate in 1963, replacing Elton Engstrom Sr., who died in office. She served until 1965. She was also a member of the Alaska House of Representatives from 1967 to 1975. She was an unsuccessful candidate for reelection in 1974. She also served on the University of Alaska Board of Regents. Banfield Hall at the University of Alaska Southeast is named for her. Banfield died in Sun City, Arizona after suffering from a stroke.

References

External links
 Mildred Banfield at 100 Years of Alaska's Legislature

1914 births
1991 deaths
20th-century American politicians
20th-century American women politicians
Republican Party Alaska state senators
Republican Party members of the Alaska House of Representatives
Midland College alumni
People from Fremont, Nebraska
People from Sun City, Arizona
Politicians from Juneau, Alaska
University of Alaska regents
University of Alaska Southeast people
University of Chicago alumni
Women state legislators in Alaska
20th-century American academics